Paul McGonagle is an American football coach. He is the head football coach at Endicott College in Beverly, Massachusetts. McGonagle was the head football coach at Fitchburg State University from 2007 to 2010.

Head coaching record

References

External links
 Endicott profile

Year of birth missing (living people)
Living people
American football offensive linemen
American football tight ends
Assumption Greyhounds football coaches
Bucknell Bison football coaches
Bentley Falcons football coaches
Eastern Kentucky Colonels football coaches
Endicott Gulls football coaches
Fitchburg State Falcons football coaches
Kentucky Wildcats football players
Northeastern Huskies football coaches
Stony Brook Seawolves football coaches